Maharajah's College, or M. R. College, established in 1879, it is an autonomous institution located in Vizianagaram, Andhra Pradesh.

History
The institution was founded by Sri Pusapati Vijayarama Gajapathi Raju, the Maharajah of Vizianagram. It was started as a middle school in 1857 and upgraded to a high school in 1868. It was upgraded to a college in 1879 under the University of Madras.

Academic Programmes
The college has 21 departments offering 19 undergraduate and postgraduate courses in arts and science streams affiliated to the Andhra University. There are about 150 permanent and temporary academic and support staff members with an annual intake of about 2,192 students in 2009.

Campus
There is a central library and 14 other departmental libraries. The central library has over 50,000 books, and various digital resource. There are seminar halls, health centre, hostels, sports facilities and a gymnasium in the campus. The Union Bank of India had its branch in the campus to cater the staff and students.

Alumi Association
The Maharajah's College Old Students's Association (MRCOSA) has been functioning since the inception of college. Its organized the Maharajah Ananda Gajapati Sapada Sata Jayanti, the 125th Anniversary of Maharajah Ananda Gajapati Raju in 1976. It was revived when the college became Autonomous in 1987. It was made an integral part of the College in 1993.

Notable alumni

 Allam Appa Rao, Vice Chancellor of Jawaharlal Nehru Technological University, Kakinada.
 A. L. Rao, Chief Operating Officer, Wipro
 Beela Satyanarayana, Vice Chancellor of Andhra University.
 Botsa Satyanarayana, Indian Parliamentarian.
 Bulusu Sambamurti, was an Indian lawyer, politician and freedom-fighter
 Chaganti Somayajulu, Telugu writers.
 Dronamraju Krishna Rao or Krishna R. Dronamraju, an Indian-born geneticist and president of the Foundation for Genetic Research in Houston, Texas. 
 Dwaram Bhavanarayana Rao, musicologist and Principal of Maharajah's Government College of Music and Dance.
 E. Venkatesam, former Judge of Andhra Pradesh High Court
 G. Ramanujulu Naidu, former Judge of Andhra Pradesh High Court.
 Ganti Jogi Somayaji, Telugu scholar and faculty in Andhra University.
 Gidugu Venkata Ramamurthy, the father of Colloquial Telugu language movement.
 Gurazada Apparao, poet.
 Indukuri Ramakrishnam Raju, better known as Rajasri, dialogue and lyrics writer in Telugu cinema.
 J. V. Somayajulu, theater and film actor.
 K. Punnayya, former Judge of Andhra Pradesh High Court and Member of Legislative Assembly.
 Dr. K. S. R. Krishna Rao
 General K. V. Krishna Rao, former Chief of the Army Staff of the Indian Army.
 Kala Venkata Rao, freedom fighter and politician.
 Kandala Subrahmanyam, lawyer and Member of Parliament from Vizianagaram constituency.
 Kotcherlakota Rangadhama Rao, Indian Physicist.
 M. V. Narayana Rao, Chief of Crime Investigation Department.
 N. Dilip Kumar, Chief of Anti-Corruption Branch.
 P. V. Ramanaiah Raja, founder of Sri Raja-Lakshmi Foundation.
 Pappu Venugopala Rao, musicologist.
 Penmetsa Satyanarayana Raju former Chief Justice of Andhra Pradesh High Court.
 T. V. R. Tatachari, Chief Justice of Delhi High Court.

External links
 Official website

References

Colleges in Andhra Pradesh
Universities and colleges in Vizianagaram district
Educational institutions established in 1879
1879 establishments in India
Uttarandhra
Colleges affiliated to Andhra University
Academic institutions formerly affiliated with the University of Madras